Raj Baveja is an Indian gynecologist, obstetrician and the former head of the department of gynecology and obstetrics at the Motilal Nehru Medical College, Allahabad. She also serves as the honorary Medical Superintendent of the Kamla Nehru Memorial Hospital, Allahabad. She hails from the Indian state of Uttar Pradesh and is the author several medical papers on adolescent gynecology, pregnancy and child birth management. She has assisted a working group on Care in Normal Birth of the World Health Organization. and headed an Indian Council of Medical Research task force on contraception in 2000. 
She is an elected fellow of the National Academy of Medical Sciences, and the Government of India awarded her the fourth highest Indian civilian honour of Padma Shri in 1983.

See also

 Pregnancy
 Child birth
 Microbiology

References

Indian gynaecologists
Indian obstetricians
Indian medical researchers
Indian medical writers
Indian medical academics
Fellows of the National Academy of Medical Sciences
20th-century Indian medical doctors
Medical doctors from Uttar Pradesh
Recipients of the Padma Shri in medicine
Living people
1934 births